Brian Kevin Patrick Murphy is an American actor, producer, and writer. He is best known for his various roles in CollegeHumor videos, his role as Murph on truTV comedy original Adam Ruins Everything, and his role on the Pop original Hot Date, co-starring with his wife Emily Axford. Axford and Murphy co-wrote HEY, U UP? (For a Serious Relationship): How to Turn Your Booty Call into Your Emergency Contact, a book of satirical relationship advice that was published in 2018.

Early life

Murphy was born October 3, 1985 and grew up in New Jersey. He went on to study at Rowan University, where he dual majored in Film and Journalism.

Other work

From 2010 to 2017, Murphy was an actor and writer for CollegeHumor. In 2015, he hosted Middle of the Night Show, a late-night television series on MTV. In 2017, Murphy and his wife Emily Axford began working as executive producers and actors on the Pop original Hot Date. The previous incarnation of the show was a web series for CollegeHumor. The TV program's second season premiered in September 2019.

Murphy was also one of the hosts of "8-Bit Book Club" alongside Axford and Caldwell Tanner, a podcast where the hosts read and discuss books and other media relating to video games. He is now the host and Dungeon Master of the HeadGum podcast "Not Another D&D Podcast" with Axford, Tanner, and Jake Hurwitz. He is also a player on Dimension 20, a Dungeons & Dragons actual play show from CollegeHumor's streaming service, Dropout.

References

External links
 Brian Murphy on IMDb

Year of birth missing (living people)
Living people
21st-century American male actors
American male television actors
CollegeHumor people
Rowan University alumni